Thomas Twining Keefler (March 26, 1824 – November 16, 1906) was a merchant and political figure in Nova Scotia, Canada. He represented Lunenburg in the House of Commons of Canada from 1882 to 1883 as a Liberal member.

He was born in Halifax, of Austrian descent. In 1870, he married Lydia Sophia Tupper. Keefler supported an elected senate. His election in 1882 was declared void and he was defeated by Charles Edwin Kaulbach in the by-election which followed in 1883.

Electoral record

References 
The Canadian parliamentary companion, 1883, JA Gemmill
 

1824 births
1906 deaths
Liberal Party of Canada MPs
Members of the House of Commons of Canada from Nova Scotia